Sportsline is a sports news magazine broadcast on the United Kingdom rolling news channel Sky News. The programme is broadcast on weekends from 19:30–20:00 (UK) following Sky News. The programme may be pre-empted by live coverage of ongoing events if this is required. The programme is usually fronted by one of the channel's sports reporters, or a presenter from Sky Sports News.

Supplementing Sportsline, Sky News introduced, at an unknown point of time, "Saturday Sport," which features a round-up of the week's major sports news. It was broadcast on Saturday at 11:30am.

Outside of Sportsline, Sky News provides sports headlines as part of the top- and bottom-of-the-hour headlines, and bulletins at :20 and :50 past the hour excluding All Out Politics, Sophy Ridge on Sunday, The Pledge and Press Preview. Sunrise, Sky's breakfast programme, featured a separate sports reporter in the same studio as the other presenters, typically presenting a sports bulletin each hour along with the "back pages" as part of the paper review on weekends. Sky News @ Breakfast also features a separate sports reporter from Friday–Sunday, who typically presents a sports bulletin at approximately :20 past each hour.

Sky also operates a rolling sports news channel, Sky Sports News, which covers sports news, analysis and results 24/7.

References

Sky News
Sky UK original programming
Sky television news shows
1990s British sports television series
2000s British sports television series
2010s British sports television series
2020s British sports television series